Brixton TopCats is a British basketball club based in the Brixton area of London. Established in 1985, the Men's first team currently compete in the National Basketball League Division 2, and the Women's team compete in the Women's British Basketball League. The club is particularly notable for its development programme, which has started the careers of Luol Deng, Ajou Deng and Ugonna Onyekwe in recent years.  The TopCats are based at Brixton Recreation Centre and since 2009 have operated a partnership with London South Bank University.

The club has received visits over the years from Prince Charles, Princess Diana, Michael Jordan, Allen Iverson, Robert Horry, Lennox Lewis, Ian Wright and Kate Hoey MP. The club's founder, owner and General Manager, Jimmy Rogers, who died in 2018, was recognised as a community leader and remembered globally in basketball communities.

Season-by-season records

References

External links
Brixton TopCats on Facebook

Basketball teams in England
Basketball teams in London
TopCats
Sport in the London Borough of Lambeth